Joculator herosae is a species of minute sea snails, marine gastropod molluscs in the family Cerithiopsidae. It was described by Cecalupo and Perugia in 2012.

References

Gastropods described in 2012
herosae